The 43rd Manitoba general election is scheduled to occur on or before October 3, 2023 to elect members to the Legislative Assembly of Manitoba.  Below is a list of candidates running in the election, ordered by riding.

Candidates by riding
† = not seeking re-election
‡ = running for re-election in different constituency
italics indicates contestant for nomination or declared interest
bold indicates party leader

Northern Manitoba

|-
| style="background:whitesmoke;"|Flin Flon
|
|
|
|
|
|
|
|
||
|Tom Lindsey
|-
| style="background:whitesmoke;"|Keewatinook
|
|
|
|Ian Bushie
|
|
|
|
||
|Ian Bushie
|-
| style="background:whitesmoke;"|Swan River
|
|
|
|
|
|
|
|
||
|Rick Wowchuk
|-
| style="background:whitesmoke;"|The Pas-Kameesak
|
|Alan Mclauchlan
|
|
|
|
|
|
||
|Amanda Lathlin 
|-
| style="background:whitesmoke;"|Thompson
|
|
|
|
|
|
|
|
||
|Eric Redhead
|}

Westman/Parkland

|-
| style="background:whitesmoke;"|Agassiz
|
|Jodie Byram
|
|
|
|
|
|
||
|Eileen Clarke†
|-
| style="background:whitesmoke;"|Turtle Mountain
|
|Doyle Piwniuk
|
|Lorna Canada Venegas-Mesa
|
|
|
|
||
|Doyle Piwniuk
|-
| style="background:whitesmoke;"|Brandon East
|
|Len Isleifson
|
| Glen Simard
|
|
|
|
||
|Len Isleifson
|-
| style="background:whitesmoke;"|Brandon West
|
|
|
|
|
|
|
|
||
|Reg Helwer†
|-
| style="background:whitesmoke;"|Dauphin
|
|
|
|Ron Kostyshyn
|
|
|
|
||
|Brad Michaleski
|-
| style="background:whitesmoke;"|Riding Mountain
|
|Greg Nesbitt
|
|
|
|
|
|
||
|Greg Nesbitt
|-
| style="background:whitesmoke;"|Spruce Woods
|
|Grant Jackson
|
|
|
|
|
|
||
|Cliff Cullen†
|}

Central Manitoba

|-
| style="background:whitesmoke;"|Borderland
|
|Josh Guenter
|
|
|
|
|
|
|
| Cliff Graydon
||
|Josh Guenter 
|-
| style="background:whitesmoke;"|Interlake-Gimli
| 
|Derek Johnson
|
|Sarah Pinsent
|
|
|
|
|
|
||
|Derek Johnson
|-
| style="background:whitesmoke;"|Lakeside
|
|Trevor King
|
|
|
|Neil Stewart
|
|
|
|
||
|Ralph Eichler†
|-
| style="background:whitesmoke;"|Midland
|
|Lauren Stone
|
|
|
|
|
|
|
|
||
|Blaine Pedersen†
|-
| style="background:whitesmoke;"|Morden-Winkler
|
|
|
|
|
|
|
|
|
|
||
|Vacant
|-
| style="background:whitesmoke;"|Springfield-Ritchot
|
|Ron Schuler
|
|
|
|
|
|
|
|
||
|Ron Schuler
|-
| style="background:whitesmoke;"|Portage la Prairie
|
|
|
|
|
|
|
|
|
|
||
|Ian Wishart†
|}

Eastman

|-
| style="background:whitesmoke;"| Dawson Trail
|
|Bob Lagassé
|
|Chris Wiebe
|
|
|
|
|
|
||
|Bob Lagassé
|-
| style="background:whitesmoke;"|Lac du Bonnet
|
|Wayne Ewasko
|
|Kathy Majowski
|
|
|
|
|
|
||
|Wayne Ewasko
|-
| style="background:whitesmoke;"|La Verendrye
|
|Konrad Narth
|
|
|
|
|
|
|
|
||
|Dennis Smook†
|-
| style="background:whitesmoke;"|Steinbach
|
|Kelvin Goertzen
|
|
|
|
|
|
|
|
||
|Kelvin Goertzen
|-
| style="background:whitesmoke;"| Red River North
|
|Jeff Wharton
|
|
|
|
|
|
|
|
||
|Jeff Wharton 
|-
| style="background:whitesmoke;"|Selkirk
|
|
|
| Mitch Obach
|
|
|
|
|
|
||
|Alan Lagimodiere†
|}

Northwest Winnipeg

|-
| style="background:whitesmoke;"|Burrows
|
|
|
|Diljeet Brar
|
|
|
|
|
|
||
|Diljeet Brar
|-
| style="background:whitesmoke;"|Kildonan-River East
|
|
|
|  Rachelle Schott 
|
|
|
|
|
|
||
|Cathy Cox†
|-
| style="background:whitesmoke;"|McPhillips
|
|
|
|
|
|
|
|
|
|
||
|Shannon Martin†
|-
| style="background:whitesmoke;"|Point Douglas
|
|
|
|Bernadette Smith
|
|
|
|
|
|
||
|Bernadette Smith
|-
| style="background:whitesmoke;"|St. Johns
|
|
|
|Nahanni Fontaine 
|
|
|
|
|
|
||
|Nahanni Fontaine
|-
| style="background:whitesmoke;"|The Maples
|
|
|
|Mintu Sandhu
|
|
|
|
|
|
||
|Mintu Sandhu
|-
| style="background:whitesmoke;"|Tyndall Park
|
|
|
|
|
|Cindy Lamoureux
|
|
|
|
||
|Cindy Lamoureux

|}

Northeast Winnipeg

|-
| style="background:whitesmoke;"|Concordia
|
|
|
|Matt Wiebe
|
|
|
|
|
|
||
|Matt Wiebe
|-
| style="background:whitesmoke;"|Elmwood
|
|
|
|Jim Maloway
|
|
|
|
|
|
||
|Jim Maloway
|-
| style="background:whitesmoke;"|Radisson
|
|James Teitsma
|
| Jelynn Dela Cruz
|
|
|
|
|
|
||
|James Teitsma
|-
| style="background:whitesmoke;"|Rossmere
|
|Andrew Micklefield
|
|Tracy Schmidt
|
|
|
|
|
|
||
|Andrew Micklefield
|-
| style="background:whitesmoke;"|St. Boniface
|
|
|
| Robert Loiselle
|
|Dougald Lamont
|
|
|
|
||
|Dougald Lamont
|-
| style="background:whitesmoke;"|Transcona
|
|
|
|Nello Altomare
|
|
|
|
|
|
||
|Nello Altomare
|}

West Winnipeg

|-
| style="background:whitesmoke;"|Assiniboia
|
| Scott Johnston
|
|
|
|
|
|
|
|
||
|Scott Johnston
|-
| style="background:whitesmoke;"|Roblin
|
|
|
|
|
|
|
|
|
|
||
|Myrna Driedger†
|-
| style="background:whitesmoke;"|Kirkfield Park
|
|Kevin Klein
|
|Logan Oxenham
|
| Rhonda Nichol
|
|
|
|
||
|Kevin Klein
|-
| style="background:whitesmoke;"|St. James
|
|
|
|Adrien Sala
|
|
|
|
|
|
||
|Adrien Sala
|-
| style="background:whitesmoke;"|Tuxedo
|
|
|
|
|
|
|
|
|
|
||
|Heather Stefanson
|}

Central Winnipeg

|-
| style="background:whitesmoke;"|Fort Garry
|
|
|
|Mark Wasyliw
|
|Shandi Strong
|
|
|
|
||
|Mark Wasyliw 
|-
| style="background:whitesmoke;"|Fort Rouge
|
|
|
|
|
|
|
|
|
|
||
|Wab Kinew
|-
| style="background:whitesmoke;"|Notre Dame
|
|
|
|
|
|
|
|
|
|
||
|Malaya Marcelino 
|-
| style="background:whitesmoke;"|River Heights
|
|
|
| Mike Moroz
|
|Jon Gerrard
|
|
|
|
||
|Jon Gerrard
|-
| style="background:whitesmoke;"|Union Station
|
|
|
|Uzoma Asagwara
|
|
|
|
|
|
||
|Uzoma Asagwara 
|-
| style="background:whitesmoke;"|Wolseley
|
|
|
|Lisa Naylor
|
|
|
|
|
|
||
|Lisa Naylor
|}

South Winnipeg

|-
| style="background:whitesmoke;"|Fort Richmond
|
|Sarah Guillemard
|
|  Jennifer Chen 
| 
|
|
|
|
|
||
|Sarah Guillemard
|-
| style="background:whitesmoke;"|Fort Whyte
|
|Obby Khan
|
| 
|
|Willard Reaves
|
|
|
|
||
|Obby Khan
|-
| style="background:whitesmoke;"|Lagimodière
|
|Andrew Smith
|
| Tyler Blashko
|
|
|
|
|
|
||
|Andrew Smith
|-
| style="background:whitesmoke;"|Riel
|
|Rochelle Squires
|
|Mike Moyes
|
|
|
|
|
|
||
|Rochelle Squires
|-
| style="background:whitesmoke;"|Seine River
|
|Janice Morley-Lecomte
|
| Billie Cross
|
|
|
|
|
|
||
|Janice Morley-Lecomte
|-
| style="background:whitesmoke;"|Southdale
|
| Audrey Gordon
|
|  Renée Cable
|
|
|
|
|
|
||
|Audrey Gordon
|-
| style="background:whitesmoke;"|St. Vital
|
|
|
|Jamie Moses 
|
|
|
|
|
|
||
|Jamie Moses
|-
| style="background:whitesmoke;"|Waverley
|
|Jon Reyes
|
|Durdana Islam
|
|Uche Nwankwo
|
|
|
|
||
|Jon Reyes
|}

References

Elections in Manitoba
Manitoba
43rd